Günther Stoll (Duisburg, 18 August 1924 – Gelsenkirchen, 10 January 1977) was a German actor.

Partial filmography
 Liebe, wie die Frau sie wünscht (1957) .... Toni
 Epitafios gia ehthrous kai filous (1965) .... Captain Ivanov
  (1966, TV Mini-Series) .... Guy Foster
 The Hunchback of Soho (1966) .... Inspektor Hopkins
 Maigret and His Greatest Case (1966) .... Alain Robin
 Omicidio per appuntamento (1967) .... Commissioner Silvio Giunta
 Street Acquaintances of St. Pauli (1968) .... Inspector Torber
 Beyond the Law (1968) .... Burtons Right Hand
 Van de Velde: Die vollkommene Ehe (1968) .... Gregor Bachmann
 Die Funkstreife Gottes (1968) .... Kaplan Wolf
 The Last Mercenary (1968) .... Man in Black
 Mattanza – Ein Liebestraum (1969) .... Krämer alias Dr. Randolf
 The Castle of Fu Manchu (1969) .... Dr. Curt Kessler
 Double Face (1969) .... Inspector Stevens
 The Priest of St. Pauli (1970) .... Heino Docke
 The Body in the Thames (1971) .... Doctor Ellis
 Return of Sabata (1971) .... Circus Show Man
 The Bloodstained Butterfly (1971) .... Attorney Giulio Cordaro
 What Have You Done to Solange? (1972) .... Professor Bascombe
  (1975) .... Stazi
 Derrick (1975–1977, TV Series) .... Schröder / Kriminalbeamter Schröder
 The Hook (1976) .... Kostas Maras

References

External links

German male television actors
German male film actors
German male stage actors
1924 births
1977 deaths
20th-century German male actors